Hans Braarvig (17 April 1905 – 11 February 1986) was a Norwegian writer.

He was born in Lillesand. He is best known as a crime writer, young adult fiction writer and novelist, partly under the pseudonym Haakon Bjerre. He was awarded the Bastian Prize for translation in 1966.

References

1905 births
1986 deaths
People from Lillesand
20th-century Norwegian novelists